Marvin Kimble (born October 27, 1995) is an American artistic gymnast. In 2015, Kimble and Jossimar Calvo of Colombia won the gold medal in the men's pommel horse event at the 2015 Pan American Games held in Toronto, Canada.

Gymnastics career
Kimble competed at the 2015 Winter Cup where he won gold on rings, silver on pommel horse and bronze on parallel bars. He competed at the 2016 Winter Cup where he won bronze on horizontal bar. He again competed at the 2018 Winter Cup where he won gold on vault and silver in the all-around.

In 2018, he won the gold medal in the men's pommel horse event at the 2018 Pacific Rim Gymnastics Championships held in Medellín, Colombia.

Kimble is also known for his High Bar, Parallel Bars and Rings. He has won multiple titles in those events and the All Around. In 2018 he won the silver on High Bar at Doha World Cup. He also got 7th on Parallel Bars and 8th on the Rings. In 2017 Marvin won the silver at Cottbus World Cup. Marvin attended the 2017 World Championship in Montreal Canada. 

Kimble recently began training with Donnell Whittenburg at Salto Gymnastics Center, with hopes to qualify for the 2020 Summer Olympics.

References

External links 
 

Living people
1995 births
Place of birth missing (living people)
American male artistic gymnasts
Gymnasts at the 2015 Pan American Games
Medalists at the 2015 Pan American Games
Pan American Games gold medalists for the United States
Pan American Games medalists in gymnastics